Glenburnie may refer to:

in Australia
 Glenburnie, South Australia, an eastern suburb of Mount Gambier, a city in South Australia.

in Canada
 Glenburnie, Ontario
 Glenburnie-Birchy Head-Shoal Brook, Newfoundland and Labrador, a town

in the United States
 Glenburnie (Natchez, Mississippi), listed on the NRHP in Adams County, Mississippi
 A hamlet in Putnam, New York
 Glenburnie (Shenandoah Junction, West Virginia), NRHP-listed, in Jefferson County